Era is an unincorporated community in Pickaway County, in the U.S. state of Ohio.

History
Era was originally called Palestine, and under the latter name was laid out in 1829. A post office called Palestine was established in 1833, the name was changed to Era in 1899, and the post office closed in 1913.

References

Unincorporated communities in Pickaway County, Ohio
Unincorporated communities in Ohio